The Center for Asian Culinary Studies (CACS) is a non-stock, non-profit culinary school located in San Juan, Metro Manila, and in Davao City, Philippines.  It was established in 2000 in Manila by Gene Gonzalez and in 2007, in Davao City. It is in consortium with the De La Salle-College of Saint Benilde.

It is the first culinary school in the Philippines to earn a Level IV accreditation in their Professional Program granted by the Technical Education and Skills Development Authority (TESDA). It is the only culinary school with this certificate in education.

Notable people
Pia Wurtzbach - Miss Universe 2015

Bea Binene - Tween Hearts

External links
Center for Asian Culinary Studies official website

Cooking schools in the Philippines
Schools in San Juan, Metro Manila
Culinary arts